Trechus agni is a species of ground beetle in the subfamily Trechinae. It was described by Deuve & Quinnec in 1985.

References

agni
Beetles described in 1985